Mike Schafer (born January 12, 1949) is an American author of books on railroading. He contributed to The Complete Book of North American Railroading.

In 1969, he co-founded the North Western Illinois Chapter of the National Railway Historical Society. He is currently the editor of Passenger Train Journal.

Published works

Sole author

Co-author

Magazine articles

References

20th-century American historians
American male non-fiction writers
Rail transport writers
1949 births
Living people
20th-century American male writers